Bayview Park may refer to:

Bayview Park, California, a census-designated place in Contra Costa County, California
Bayview Park, Coronado, a park in Coronado, California
Bayview Park, Methil, a former association football stadium in Methil, Fife, Scotland
Bayview Park, Ontario, a community in the township of Georgian Bay, Ontario, Canada
Bayview Park, San Francisco, a park in southeast San Francisco, California
Bayview Park ferry wharf, Sydney, a ferry wharf in Sydney, New South Wales, Australia